Juan Berrocal González (born 5 February 1999) is a Spanish professional footballer who plays as a central defender for SD Eibar.

Club career
Born in Jerez de la Frontera, Cádiz, Andalusia, Berrocal was a Sevilla FC youth graduate. He made his senior debut with the reserves on 3 September 2017, starting in a 1–2 home loss against Cultural y Deportiva Leonesa in the Segunda División. 

On 3 July 2018, Berrocal renewed his contract until 2022. He made his first-team and European debut on 9 August, starting and playing the full match in a 1–0 home win against FK Žalgiris, in the third qualifying round of the 2018–19 UEFA Europa League.

On 25 August 2020, Berrocal joined CD Mirandés in the second division, on loan for the season. The following 22 July, he moved to fellow league team Sporting de Gijón also in a temporary deal.

On 11 July 2022, Sevilla announced the transfer of Berrocal to SD Eibar in the second division.

Career statistics

Club

References

External links

1999 births
Living people
Footballers from Jerez de la Frontera
Spanish footballers
Association football defenders
Segunda División players
Segunda División B players
Sevilla Atlético players
Sevilla FC players
CD Mirandés footballers
Sporting de Gijón players
SD Eibar footballers
Spain youth international footballers